was a leading general in the Imperial Japanese Army in the Second Sino-Japanese War.

Biography
Kasahara was born into a military family in Sendai, but attended the First Tokyo Middle School as a youth. He graduated from the 22nd class of the Imperial Japanese Army Academy in 1913, and from the 22nd class of the Army Staff College in November 1918.

Kasahara was sent as a military attaché to Moscow, Russia from 1929 to 1932, and became fluent in the Russian language. On March 4, 1931, a telegram sent by Kasahara to the general staff in Tokyo was intercepted and decoded by Soviet  military intelligence and forwarded to Stalin. In that, Yukio belittled Red Army's capabilities and urged "a speedy war" before the good timing passes. On December, 13, 1931, the OGPU decoded and forwarded to Stalin a conversation between Kasahara and his superior visiting Moscow, which advocating for war before the USSR became too strong and underscoring that “the countries on the Soviet western border (i.e., at a minimum Poland and Romania) are in a position to act with us. The thinking of Japanese ambassador to USSR, Hiroki Kota,“the cardinal objective of this war must lay not so much in protecting Japan from Communism as in seizing the Soviet Far East and Eastern Siberia” was also mentioned that.

On his return to Japan, he was assigned to the Soviet Branch of the 4th Section (European & American Military Intelligence), 2nd Bureau, of the Imperial Japanese Army General Staff.

From 1933 to 1934, he became an instructor at the Cavalry School, and was subsequently appointed commander of the Imperial Guards Cavalry Regiment from 1934 to 1936.  Kasahara returned to the 2nd Bureau of the General Staff in 1936 as Chief of the 4th Section, 5th Section and 6th Section, covering all of the European, American and Russian Intelligence. He was a major proponent of the Strike North Group (hokushin-ron) philosophy, feeling strongly that the Soviet Union posed a major threat and a major opportunity for Japan.

From 1937 to 1938, Kasahara was sent to Manchukuo as Vice Chief of Staff of the Kwantung Army. He visited Germany as part of a military mission in 1938 after the conclusion of the Tripartite Pact, and returned to the General Staff on his return to Japan.  However, Kasahara was soon dispatched back to China. From 1939 to 1941, he served as Chief of Staff of the Northern China Area Army. He was then promoted to commander in chief of the IJA 12th Division from 1941 to 1942.  For most of the remainder of the war (1942–1945), Kasahara served as Chief of Staff of the Kwantung Army. However, in April 1945, he was appointed to replace General Yoshio Kozuki as commander of the IJA 11th Army, and thus participated in the Operation Ichi-Go offensive, notably at the Battle of Guilin-Liuzhou.

References

Books

External links

Notes

1880s births
1988 deaths
Military personnel from Miyagi Prefecture
Japanese generals
Japanese military personnel of World War II